Ken Lester (born 9 April 1947) is a British rower and cox. He competed in the men's coxed pair event at the 1960 Summer Olympics as the cox at the age of 13, and is Britain's youngest male Olympian.

References

1947 births
Living people
British male rowers
Olympic rowers of Great Britain
Rowers at the 1960 Summer Olympics
People from Didcot